Lowther Hall Anglican Grammar School, most often referred to simply as Lowther Hall, is an independent comprehensive single-sex primary and secondary day school for girls, located in Essendon, an inner suburb of Melbourne, Victoria, Australia.

Established in 1920 through the amalgamation of Blinkbonnie's Ladies' College and Winstow Girls' School, the school has a non-selective enrolment policy and currently caters for 900 students from Kindergarten to Year 12.

Lowther Hall is affiliated with the Association of Heads of Independent Schools of Australia (AHISA), the Junior School Heads Association of Australia (JSHAA), the Alliance of Girls' Schools Australasia (AGSA), the Association of Independent Schools of Victoria (AISV), and is a founding member of Girls Sport Victoria (GSV).

History 
Lowther Hall comprises numerous buildings, varying in age. At the centre of the school is "Earlsbrae Hall", commonly referred to by students, parents and staff as "The Mansion". It was built over two years by W.K. Noble, to a design by renowned architect, R. A. Lawson, for the brewer, Coiler McCracken. Finished in 1890, the exterior of the mansion is described  as a Graeco-Roman temple with Corinthian columns. Inside the mansion there is an extensive use of carved woodwork and stained glass windows.

In 1911, Earlsbrae Hall was bought by E.W. Cole, owner of Cole's Book Arcade. After Cole died in 1918, the house was sold for £6500 to the Church of England Trusts Co-operative for the Diocese of Melbourne, to be used for educational purposes. The school was named after Archbishop Henry Lowther Clarke who directed the purchase of the building.

In 1920, Blinkbonnie's Ladies' College in Moonee Ponds, and Winstow Girls' School in Essendon, merged to become Lowther Hall Anglican Grammar School. Essendon's Afton College, a coeducational school, amalgamated with the School in the 1930s.

"The Mansion" includes a drawing room, as well as the administration wing of the school, along with music classrooms and the principal's office.

Campus
Lowther Hall Anglican Grammar is located on Leslie Road in Essendon, which is situated close to amenities such as Essendon Station. There is also a hall, named the Joan M Garde Cultural Centre, which houses dance and drama classrooms, private music rooms, a lecture theatre, changerooms, a stage, and sports offices. The Noelene Horton Centre focuses on the sciences over three levels, one of which is a rooftop learning area and the basement houses dance and music. Blinkbonnie House was opened in February 2018 and provides new amenities for students who are in Kindergarten, Prep and Year 1. The basement houses performing arts, media and the Mary Thurman Recital Space.

Houses 
The Houses at Lowther Hall, all named after Anglican Archbishops, are Booth (orange(was brown)), Clarke (green), Hindley (red), Lees (blue), Moorhouse (yellow) and Perry (purple). Each year, the Houses compete in events such as athletics, swimming and Performing Arts, and each year, the House Cup is awarded to the House with the highest total of points from the year's events.

School structure
The student body is arranged in four sections. The Early Years Centre completed at the beginning of 2018 is known as Blinkbonnie House and houses girls who are in Kindergarten, Prep and Year 1. Blinkbonnie House consists of three levels (the basement is known as "the Burrow", ground floor as "the Grasslands" and top level as "the Sky" and they are all themed throughout accordingly). On the ground level there is a kitchen for use in cooking classes and the Tawny Frogmouth reading nook is housed on the first floor. New playgrounds contain a range of surfaces and textures to explore as well as elements such as water pumps, bridges and streams to evoke discussion about scientific concepts.

Years 2 to 6 are housed in the Junior School, which is also known as Raymond House. Raymond House is undergoing refurbishments and when completed will include a new music area and also a science and technology centre. The outdoor area adjacent to the Raymond House has expanded and the students now have a large grassed area to use for recreation and sport. Each class in Raymond House ends with the suffix R or D, these being the letters at the beginning and end of "R"aymon"D". Raymond House girls utilise their library which is adjacent to the Senior School's Learning Resource Centre.

Sampford House houses students from Years 7 to 9. It consists of two stories and has recently undergone major renovations. On ground level there is a multi-purpose area, food technology kitchen and tutor room – as well as classrooms. Sampford House was named after a Principal, Evelyn. E. Sampford. Each homegroup in Years 7 to 9 ends with the suffix S, M, P or F – letters drawn from the word 'S a M P Ford'. Years 10, 11 and 12 form Grant House and each Year 10 homegroup ends in G N or T, from the word Grant. Year 11 and 12 homerooms are in Houses: Booth, Clarke, Hindley, Lees, Moorhouse and Perry. The Grant House facilities connect with the Sampford House areas. The Year 12 students have special study, careers advice and recreation areas located on the ground floor. Both Sampford House and Grant House students have access to the "Learning Resource Centre" which is on level 1. Level 2 hosts Art, Ceramics and Visual Communication and Design areas and a studio.

Co-curriculum

Sport
Lowther Hall is a member of Girls Sport Victoria (GSV). Twenty-four girl's schools participate in GSV alongside Lowther. Lowther has gained a reputation in the hip-hop dance sport area, with teams in state and national finals. The School has also had successful rowing seasons. Lowther Hall has won many titles in sport. Most being in soccer, hip hop, netball, basketball, swimming and athletics.

GSV premierships 
Lowther Hall has won the following GSV premiership.

 Indoor Cricket - 2016

Co-curricular 
Lowther Hall is known for its extensive range of co-curricular activities. This includes: Debating, F1 in Schools, Tournament of Minds, Sport, Music, Productions, Tutoring, Choirs and Drama. Clubs are run by the Year 6 (Junior School) and Year 12 (Senior School) Leaders and Captains. Maths Games day and the Science and Engineering Challenge also take place.

Music

Girls take an active role in Classroom Music, Co-curricular Music, Private Music, and the Instrumental and Choral Program. Students perform regularly at many events such as the Carol Service at St Paul's Cathedral, Eisteddfods, Mt Gambier Generations in Jazz Festival, the annual 'Evening of Song' concert, Winter String Festival, Paris Cat Jazz Gigs, Assemblies, Chapel, Concerts and many public performances.

The curriculum for Classroom Music is based on Kodaly's philosophies. Students participate in practical and classroom music activities and use musical instruments and voice to compose, improvise and acquire aural skills. Classroom Music is taught throughout the school from Kindergarten to Year 12 VCE Music, with an additional compulsory Instrumental Program from Years 3 to 8.

Music concerts and events
 Choir Tour New York
 Evening of Jazz Paris Cat Jazz Club
 Musical
 Evening of Song Clocktower Theatre
 Generations in Jazz Mt Gambier
 Principal's Soiree
 Autumn Band Festival
 Winter String Festival
 Piano Festival
 Music Camp Daylesford
 Annual Music Concert Melbourne Recital Centre
 Junior Music Concert
 Carols St Paul's Cathedral
 Music Recitals, Masterclasses
 Soirees

Music ensembles
 Lowther Singers (Yr7-12)
 Senior School Chamber Choir
 Raymond Singers (Yr3-6)
 Junior School Chamber Choir (Yr4-6)
 Gr 2 Songbirds
 Symphonic Band
 Intermediate Concert Band (Yr 7 and 8)
 Junior Concert Band
 Big Band
 Intermediate Chamber Strings (Yr 6,7,8)
 Lowther Orchestra
 Senior Strings
 Junior School Chamber Strings
 Chocle Strings
 Senior, Intermediate, Junior String Quartets
 Senior, Intermediate Piano Trios
 Senior Flute Ensemble
 Junior Flute Ensemble
 Percussion Ensemble
 Senior School Piano Ensemble
 Double Trouble Piano Ensemble
 Ferguson Strings
 Jazz Band
 Woodwind Ensemble

Girls' Voices of the Cathedral 
Lowther Hall was chosen to provide the Southern Hemisphere's first female cathedral choir at St Paul's Cathedral in Melbourne after an 18-month selection process. 18 girls from across Years 4 to 10 comprise the choir. The girls alternate with the traditional choir of boys and men, which has been leading choral services at St Paul's since 1888.

Charity
The school currently supports various charities, as well as a school in Bangladesh. Term Three is designated as a fundraising term where various activities are organised in order to raise money for charities.

See also 

 List of non-government schools in Victoria
 St Paul's Cathedral, Melbourne

References

External links 
Lowther Hall Anglican Grammar School
Girls' Sport Victoria
Debaters' Association of Victoria
History of Lowther Hall

Girls' schools in Victoria (Australia)
Educational institutions established in 1920
Anglican secondary schools in Melbourne
Junior School Heads Association of Australia Member Schools
Robert Lawson buildings
1920 establishments in Australia
Anglican primary schools in Melbourne
Essendon, Victoria
Alliance of Girls' Schools Australasia
Grammar schools in Australia
Buildings and structures in the City of Moonee Valley